Legends: Short Novels by the Masters of Modern Fantasy is a 1998 anthology of 11 novellas (short novels) by a number of English-language fantasy authors, edited by Robert Silverberg. All the stories were original to the collection, and set in the authors' established fictional worlds. The anthology won a Locus Award for Best Anthology in 1999. Its science fiction equivalent, Far Horizons, followed in 1999.

The collection has a sequel, Legends II, published in 2003.

Contents 
 Stephen King: "The Little Sisters of Eluria" (The Dark Tower)
 Terry Goodkind: "Debt of Bones" (The Sword of Truth)
 Orson Scott Card: "Grinning Man" (The Tales of Alvin Maker)
 Robert Silverberg: "The Seventh Shrine" (Majipoor)
 Ursula K. Le Guin: "Dragonfly" (Earthsea)
 Raymond E. Feist: "The Wood Boy" (The Riftwar Cycle)
 Terry Pratchett: "The Sea and Little Fishes" (Discworld)
 George R. R. Martin: The Hedge Knight (novella, A Song of Ice and Fire)
 Tad Williams: "The Burning Man" (Memory, Sorrow and Thorn)
 Anne McCaffrey: "Runner of Pern" (Dragonriders of Pern)
 Robert Jordan: "New Spring" (The Wheel of Time)

Editions 

A re-release was published by Voyager in which Legends was split into two halves, both titled Legends.
 Volume One  - published on November 1, 1999, containing:
 "The Sea and Little Fishes"
 "Runner of Pern"
 "The Hedge Knight"
 "The Burning Man"
 "New Spring"
 Volume Two  - published on April 3, 2000 (a special overseas edition (same details) was issued in 1999), both containing:
 "The Little Sisters of Eluria"
 "Debt of Bones"
 "Grinning Man"
 "The Seventh Shrine"
 "Dragonfly"
 "The Wood Boy"

Serialization
In 1999 Tor Books decided to re-release the stories from the anthology, now split across three volumes.
 Legends Vol. 1 (1999)  - "The Little Sisters of Eluria", "The Seventh Shrine", "Grinning Man", and "The Wood Boy"
 Legends Vol. 2 (1999)  - "Debt of Bones", "The Hedge Knight", and "Runner of Pern"
 Legends Vol. 3 (2000)  - "New Spring", "Dragonfly", "The Burning Man", and "The Sea and Little Fishes"

Reception
Legends won a Locus Award for Best Anthology in 1999.

See also

 Far Horizons
 Legends II

References

External links
 
 

1998 anthologies
Fantasy anthologies
Robert Silverberg anthologies
Voyager Books books